Henry Leonard James May  (13 April 1912 – 22 April 1995) was a New Zealand politician of the Labour Party. He was a cabinet minister from 1972 to 1975.

Biography

Early life and career
May was born in Petone in 1912. He attended Petone convent school. He left school at 13 and found employment with Lever Brothers, later studying engineering part-time at Wellington Technical College. He then gained a job at the New Zealand Railways Department in the late 1920s, where soon after his wages were cut by 10% as part of the retrenchment policies of the United–Reform coalition government. He was also member of the Amalgamated Society of Railway Servants. At the outbreak of World War II his position with the railways was classified as a reserved occupation and he was ineligible to serve overseas. He subsequently served in the volunteer fire brigade to help fill the void of men that were overseas. After the war he left the railways and became the caretaker of the Petone waterworks.

His family were active in the Trade union movement and he was involved in politics from his days at school. Throughout the 1920s he delivered Labour Party leaflets and attended party meetings with his grandfather Chip Oakley, a local baker. By the 1930s he was a local organiser and electorate secretary.

In 1940 he married his first wife Annie McNeill and built their own home in Korokoro. They had four children and were married for 27 years before she died in a road accident in May 1967 on Hutt Road.

Political career

From 1947 to 1956 he was a member of the Petone Borough Council. His brother, Joe, was also a Petone Borough Councillor who had played rugby for Wellington B and had married Henry's wife Annie's sister. As a councillor he was opposed to the proposed amalgamation of Petone with Lower Hutt. He was also a member of the Hutt River Board and Hutt Power and Gas Board.

In February 1954 after long-serving Labour MP Harry Combs announced he would retire at the general election later that year owing to ill health. May put himself forward for the Labour nomination to replace him on Onslow. May's selection had been something of a surprise as the former Labour Party president James Roberts was the other main candidate. The National Party decided not to stand a candidate and May won the seat unopposed. May first learned of his default victory via a telegram from Petone MP Mick Moohan inviting him to attend that evening's session of parliament. May did so and was sworn in as an MP that very evening. At the general election in November May defeated Wilfred Fortune (the retiring MP for Eden) by 519 votes, confirming him as the MP.

He served as Labour's senior whip from 1958 to 1972. As senior whip during the Second Labour Government, which had a working majority of one, May became the "numbers man" and was tasked with ensuring that whenever the house divided the government had a majority present in the house. He was chairman of Parliament's Local Bills Committee which in 1960 produced the "May Report" recommending New Zealand adopt regional councils and fewer borough councils and local authorities.

In 1951 he was elected a member of the Labour Party executive. In 1963 he stood unsuccessfully for the Labour Party vice-presidency but was beaten by Norman Kirk. He stood again in 1966 and was successful, holding the office for three years until 1969 when he was defeated by Bill Rowling.

After the formation of the Third Labour Government May stood for the cabinet and was tied for the final place in the caucus ballot with Ron Bailey (whom he had shared an office with for many years) with May narrowly winning. Prime Minister Norman Kirk regretted two friends being pitted against one another but was Bailey took the defeat graciously. May was appointed by Kirk as Minister of Internal Affairs and Minister of Local Government from 1972 to 1975. In 1974 he gained additional responsibility as Minister of Civil Defence. As Minister of Internal Affairs he was a patron of the arts. He increased the funding for the Queen Elizabeth II Arts Council 127% and boosted the Historic Places Trust funding by an extra $63,000 as well. His main accomplishment as a minister was restructuring New Zealand's local government setup in 1974, largely inspired by the "May Report" over a decade earlier.

Following Norman Kirk's death he was responsible for organising his state funeral. May also created the New Zealand Fire Service in 1975, merging the 26 permanent and 251 volunteer fire brigades in co-operation with Sir Jack Hunn.

The Labour government was unexpectedly defeated at the 1975 general election and May lost his ministerial roles. May was also unexpectedly defeated by Bill Lambert in the Western Hutt electorate. While initially ahead of Lambert by the slender margin of 8 votes his position was tenuous with over one thousand special votes yet to be counted and the overall nationwide swing to National counting against him. Nevertheless May pointed to the fact that in every previous election he had gained votes after specials were counted and stated "I am not throwing in the towel yet". Ultimately he was defeated after the final count was made however finishing 168 votes (only 0.88%) behind Lambert.

Later life and death
Following his defeat, May moved to Waikanae with his second wife, Doreen, and became a gardener in his retirement. He was appointed a Companion of the Queen's Service Order for public services in the 1976 Queen's Birthday Honours.

May died on 22 April 1995, aged 83 years. He was survived by his second wife Doreen, who died in 2010.

Notes

References

|-

|-

|-

|-

1912 births
1995 deaths
New Zealand trade unionists
New Zealand Labour Party MPs
Members of the Cabinet of New Zealand
Companions of the Queen's Service Order
New Zealand MPs for Hutt Valley electorates
New Zealand MPs for Wellington electorates
Members of the New Zealand House of Representatives
Unsuccessful candidates in the 1975 New Zealand general election
Local politicians in New Zealand